Lupinus chamissonis is a species of lupine known by the common name Chamisso bush lupine. It is endemic to California, where it is known from most of the length of the coastline. It grows in sand dunes and other immediate coastal habitat.

Description
The herbage is coated in silvery hairs.

Each flower is light purple to blue with a yellow spot on its banner.

References

External links

 Calflora Database: Lupinus chamissonis (Chamisso bush lupine, Dune bush lupine)
Jepson Manual Treatment - Lupinus chamissonis
Lupinus chamissonis - U.C. Photo gallery

chamissonis
Endemic flora of California
Natural history of the California chaparral and woodlands
Adelbert von Chamisso
Taxa named by Johann Friedrich von Eschscholtz
Flora without expected TNC conservation status